Lam Lueang or Lam Lüang is a musical genre developed in Laos. Inspired by Thai music, it combines singing and story-telling, improvisation, and dance. Lam Luang centers around story-telling through music and specifically focuses on retelling folklore and epics through music, but has also be used to reflect on modern community concerns by contemporary artists.

References

Lam luang
Laotian music